Human is a death metal band from Christchurch, New Zealand.

Human was originally formed on 8 March 1992 by brothers Paul and Scott Harrison (on drums and guitars respectively), and vocalist / guitarist Nathan Ballard.  The bassist Vaughn Richardson joined them in May of that year.

Human entered Nga Matuaka Studios in May and recorded a 3 track demo cassette titled "Organ Splatters" which was distributed freely throughout the heavy metal underground / tape swapping networks around at the time. The band later appeared on a September 1992 addition of New Zealand's 60 Minutes programme on TV3 as part of a documentary that focused on suicide and depression, and the connection to heavy metal music.

Human has toured and recorded several times since then and continues today.

Discography
 1992 – Organ Splatters (3 song demo)
 1993 – Vomit Discreetly (10 song demo)
 1993 – Things That Make You Go (6 song demo)
 1994 – Crunchy Frog (7" single, b/w Foreskin Face)
 1995 – Not So Famous Game Show Themes (7 song demo)
 1996 – Playtime for the Sex Machine (6 song demo)
 1999 – The Sound of Yellow (album)
 2000 – 69 Minutes of Self Abusement (demo compilation)
 2002 – Demo Disc (3 song promo disc)
 2004 – Blood Bucket (album + 2 videos)
 2009 – Cadaver Academy (album)

Personnel

Current HUMAN personnel 
Scott Spatcher-Harrison – vocals, lead guitar (1992–present)
Vaughn Richardson – vocals, distorted bass (1992–present)
Keiran Brewster – vocals, rhythm guitar (2005–present)
Victor Thompson – drums, percussion (2013–present)

Past HUMAN personnel 
Adam McGrath – bass (1992)
Nathan Ballard – vocals, rhythm guitar (1992)
Matt "Matt Alien" Johnstone  – vocals (1993–1995)
Tim Facoorey – rhythm guitar (1997–2004)
Mitch Hopley – rhythm guitar (2004–2005)
Paul Harrison – drums (1992–2008)
Nikolas Kissel – drums (2008–2012)
Daniel Pawsey – drums (2012–2013)

Timeline

References

External links
 Official band website
 Official band Facebook site
 Official band Twitter site
 Official band MySpace site
 Official band YouTube site

New Zealand heavy metal musical groups
Musical groups established in 1992